Bowman's Bus Services was an Australian bus company in Adelaide.

History
In April 1935, David Bowman commenced operating a weekly  bus service from Hope Valley to the Adelaide city centre via Peserverance Road. The service quickly expanded to become twice daily. From circa 1937, a second service commenced from Tea Tree Gully to One Tree Hill.

A second service from Tea Tree Gully to Adelaide via North East Road later commenced. Following David Bowman's passing in 1967, it passed to his sons, Jack and Milton.

By the early 1970s, Bowman's had expanded to operate nine routes:
540: One Tree Hill to Adelaide city centre
541: Fairview Park to Adelaide city centre
542: Tea Tree Gully to Adelaide city centre
543: Redwood Park to Adelaide city centre
544: Westfield Tea Tree Plaza - Modbury Heights
550: St Agnes - Adelaide city centre
551: St Agnes - Adelaide city centre
560: Tea Tree Gully - Elizabeth
561: Tea Tree Gully - Salisbury

With falling revenues and rising costs, on 11 February 1974 the routes of Bowman's, along with those of 11 other operators, were taken over by the Municipal Tramways Trust.

Fleet
Up until the late 1950s, the fleet had primarily consisted of front-engined Fords. In 1959, the first of 15 Commers was delivered. These were followed by Bedford SBs and Hino RC320Ps. When operations ceased in February 1974, the fleet consisted of 36 buses and six coaches. All passed to the Municipal Tramways Trust.

Depots
In 1970, Bowman's opened a state of the art facility in St Agnes.

References

Bus companies of South Australia
Transport companies established in 1935
Transport companies disestablished in 1974
Transport in Adelaide
Australian companies established in 1935
1974 disestablishments in Australia
Defunct bus companies of Australia